The 2012 Ligue 1 season was the 49th of the competition of the first-tier football in Senegal and the fifth professional season.  The tournament was organized by the Senegalese Football Federation.  The season began slightly later on 24 December 2011 and finished on 2 September 2012.  It was the fourth season labelled as a "League" ("Ligue" in French).  Casa Sport won their first and only title, and a year later would compete in the 2013 CAF Champions League.  ASC HLM (participated in Ligue 2 during the season) the winner of the 2012 Senegalese Cup participated in the 2013 CAF Confederation Cup the following season.

The season would have feature 16 clubs, this time into two groups A and B and the final phase or the title pool would be used.  The first two of each group succeeds into the final phase and the club with the highest number of points wins the title.  Both the group system and the final phase would appear for the last time in Senegalese top level division.  The season scored a total of 194, of which 176 were in groups A (97 goals) and B (79 goals) and 18 in the final phase.  Diambars and Ouakam scored the most goals sharing the club total of 18, five clubs scored under ten goals, Yakaar and Dahra scored only a total of four goals, the lowest in several years.  The season had a total of 120 matches, 112 in groups A and B.  The goal totals were 40% less than the previous season.

US Ouakam again was the defending team of the title.

Participating clubs

 NGB ASC Niarry Tally
 Diambars FC
 AS Douanes
 ASC Yeggo
 Dakar Université Club
 ASC Linguère
 Compagnie sucrière sénégalaise (Senegalese Sugar Company)
 ASC Touré Kunda

 ASC Diaraf
 Casa Sport
 US Ouakam
 US Gorée
 ASC Yakaar
 AS Pikine
 Guédiawaye FC
 Dahra FC

Overview
The league was contested by 16 teams, of which 8 clubs were in each of the two groups.

League standings

Group A

Group B

Second and final phase

Notes

References

External links
 2012 Senegalese season at RSSSF
 Standings at FIFA site

Senegal
2011–12 in Senegalese football
Senegal Premier League seasons